Marie-Thérèse Paquin,  was born July 4, 1905 in Montreal, Quebec, and died in the same city on May 9, 1997. She was a concert pianist and piano professor.

Biography 
Paquin studied piano with Alfred La Liberté. She had a brilliant career as a member of a quartet for 20 years. She was pianist for the Montreal Symphony Orchestra from 1936 to 1964.  She played under the direction of many great names such as Pierre Monteux, Charles Münch, Igor Stravinski, Wilfrid Pelletier, J.J. Gagnier, Jean-Marie Beaudet and Jean Deslauriers.

Honneurs 
1980 - Member of the Order of Canada
1982 - Prix Calixa-Lavallée
1987 - Chevalier de l'Ordre national du Québec

Sources 
 
 Marie-Thérèse Paquin, C.M., Membre (1980) de l'Order of Canada
 Marie-Thérèse Vintrin-Paquin (1905 – 1997), Chevalière (1987) de l'Ordre national du Québec

References 

1905 births
1997 deaths
Canadian women pianists
French Quebecers
Knights of the National Order of Quebec
Members of the Order of Canada
Musicians from Montreal
20th-century Canadian pianists
Women classical pianists
20th-century Canadian women musicians
20th-century women pianists